The Miss International Netherlands (Known as Miss Nederland International) is a beauty pageant which selects Miss Netherlands to the Miss International pageant.

History
The Netherlands was debuted at the Miss International beauty pageant in 1960 by Miss Holland contest. Along with Holland representatives for Miss Universe and Miss World, Miss Netherlands for Miss International also became the most prestigious title at the Miss Holland contest. In 1961 Miss Holland 1961, Stam van Baer won Miss International 1961 in Long Beach, California, USA. Between 2002 and 2008 the Netherlands did not exist at the pageant. 

In 2009 the Netherlands comes from Katia Maes directorship in Miss International history. The winner of Miss International Netherlands may come at the Miss International beauty pageant which mostly happens in Japan. The reigning title is expected to serve as Ambassador of Peace in the Netherlands.

Titleholders
Color key

Miss Nederland/Miss Universe Nederland 1994-2001

Miss Holland 1960-1993

References

See also
Miss Nederland

External links 
 missitems.be
 Miss International Netherlands

 
Beauty pageants in the Netherlands 
Recurring events established in 2009
2009 establishments in the Netherlands
Dutch awards